Taurupe Manor is a manor house in the historical region of Vidzeme, in northern Latvia. Originally built after 1724, it was rebuilt in Tudor Neo-Gothic style around 1900 according to a design by architect Vilhelms Bokslafs for the owner Baron von Transe. During the 1905 Russian revolution Baron von Transe was shot to death by local peasants, his manor vandalized and then put on the fire. When the structure was finally repaired, it lost most of its former architectural details. In the 1920s Taurupe Manor was nationalized in accordance with Latvian Land Reform of 1920. After 1938 it was used as a school building, currently housing the Taurupe secondary school. In the Soviet period a third storey was added after the previous second story roof suffered fire damage.

See also
List of palaces and manor houses in Latvia

References

External links
 Taurupe Manor
 

Manor houses in Latvia